Yuquan is a town in Jiayuguan City, Gansu province, China. , it administers the following three villages:
Jiayuguan Village
Huangcaoying Village
Duanshankou Village

References

Township-level divisions of Gansu
Jiayuguan City